Erhua; also called erization or rhotacization of syllable finals) is a phonological process that adds r-coloring or the "er" (注音：, common words: 、、) sound (transcribed in IPA as ) to syllables in spoken Mandarin Chinese. Erhuayin is the pronunciation of "er" after rhotacization of syllable finals.

It is most common in the speech varieties of North China, especially in the Beijing dialect, as a diminutive suffix for nouns, though some dialects also use it for other grammatical purposes.  The Standard Chinese spoken in government-produced educational and examination recordings features erhua to some extent, as in  nǎr ("where"),  yìdiǎnr ("a little"), and  hǎowánr ("fun"). Colloquial speech in many northern dialects has more extensive erhua than the standardized language. Southwestern Mandarin dialects such as those of  Chongqing and Chengdu also have erhua. By contrast, many Southern Chinese who speak their own languages may have difficulty pronouncing the sound or may simply prefer not to pronounce it, and usually avoid words with erhua when speaking Standard Chinese; for example, the three examples listed above may be replaced with the synonyms  nǎlǐ,  yìdiǎn,  hǎowán. Furthermore, Erhua is extremely rare or absent in Taiwanese Mandarin speakers.

Only a small number of words in standardized Mandarin, such as  èr "two" and  ěr "ear", have r-colored vowels that do not result from the erhua process. All of the non-erhua r-colored syllables have no initial consonant, and are traditionally pronounced  in Beijing dialect and in conservative/old Standard Mandarin varieties. In the recent decades, the vowel in the toned syllable "er" has been lowered in many accents, making the syllable come to approach or acquire a quality like "ar" (i.e.,  with the appropriate tone).

Rules in Standard Mandarin

The basic rules controlling the surface pronunciation of erhua are as follows:

Coda
 is deleted and the syllable becomes nasalized.
 becomes rhotacized.
Nucleus
 becomes  if it is an underlying .
 and  become rhotacized.
 and  become glides ( and ).
 is deleted.

The following chart shows how the finals are affected by the addition of this suffix:

Examples

  (yìpíng, one bottle) →  (yìpíngr), pronounced 
  (gōngyuán, public garden) →  (gōngyuánr), pronounced 
  (xiǎohái, small child) →  (xiǎoháir), pronounced 
  (shì) (thing) →  (shìr), pronounced

Beijing dialect
Additionally, some words may sound unnatural without rhotacization, as is the case with / (huā/huār "flower"). In these cases, the erhua serves to label the word as a noun (and sometimes a specific noun among a group of homophones). Since in modern Mandarin many single-syllable words (in which there are both nouns and adjectives) share the same pronunciation, adding such a label on nouns can reduce the complication. 

As an example, the syllable wǎn may mean one of "bowl", "gentleness", "to take (hand) with hand; to roll (sleeve)", a short form of "Anhui", a place name and surname, and "late; night". However, of these words, only "" (wǎnr, bowl, or the little bowl) can generally have erhua. Further, many people erhua 晚, but only when it means "night" and not "late". The rest never has erhua, and erhua attempts will cause incomprehension.

Erhua does not always occur at the end of a word in Beijing dialect. Although it must occur at the end of the syllable, it can be added to the middle of many words, and there is not a rule to explain when it should be added to the middle. For example,  (bǎnrzhuān, "brick", especially the brick used as a weapon) should not be  (bǎnzhuānr).

The composition of the erhua system varies within Beijing, with the following variations reported. Apart from sub dialects, many sociological factors are involved, such as gender, age, ethnicity, inner/outer city, South/North. 
 Some differentiate -ar (nucleus a with no coda) from -anr/-air (nucleus a with coda -i/-n). The typical distinction is  vs .
 Some merge -er (single e with erhua) with -enr/-eir. This may depend on phonological environments, such as the tone and the preceding consonant.
 Some merge -ier and -üer from -ir/-inr and -ür/-ünr.
 Some merge -uor with -uir/-unr.
 Some lose the nasalization of -ngr, thus potentially merging pairs like -ir/-ingr, -enr/-engr and -angr/-anr.

In other Mandarin varieties
Note: Tones in this part are marked by the tone diacritics of the corresponding tone in Standard Mandarin, and do not necessarily represent the actual realization of tones.

The realization and behavior of erhua are very different among Mandarin dialects. Certain vowels' qualities may also change. However, depending on the exact dialect, the actual behavior, rules and realization can differ greatly.

Chongqing and Chengdu dialects
Erhua in Chengdu and Chongqing is collapsed to only one set:    , Many words become homophonous as a result, for example  bǎnr "board" and  běnr "booklet", both pronounced  with the appropriate tone. It is technically feasible to write all erhua in Pinyin simply as -er.

Besides its diminutive and differentiating functions, erhua in these two dialects can also make the language more vivid. In Chongqing, erhua can also be derogative. 

Different from Beijing, erhua can be applied to people's names and kinship words, such as cáoyēr (diminutive of the name Cao Ying ) and xiǎomèr "little sister".

Erhua occurs in more names of places, vegetables and little animals compared to Beijing.

Erhua causes sandhi for the reduplication of monosyllabic words. In both dialects, the application of erhua to a monosyllabic noun usually results in its reduplication, e.g.  "dish" becomes  pánpánr "little dish". The second syllable invariably has yángpíng or the second tone.

In Chongqing, erhua causes sandhi in some bisyllabic reduplicative adverbs, where second syllable acquires  or the first tone.

Northeast and Shandong dialects

Northeastern Mandarin, Jilu Mandarin, and Jiaoliao Mandarin generally differentiate more pairs of erhua than in Beijing.

The resultant erhua rhymes of those of nucleus  with coda  and with zero coda are widely distinguished.

The difference is usually exhibited in the erhua coda and/or the quality of the nucleus.

Non-rhotic erhua

A handful of words exhibit a fossilized lexical form of nasal-coda erhua. An example is  bíting  "nasal mucus", cf. the etymon  bíti .

Nanjing dialect

The Nanking dialect preserves the checked syllable and thus possesses a coda .

In other Chinese languages

Wu
Wu Chinese varieties exhibit a similar phenomenon with the morpheme , generally pronounced . The erhua coda is almost always a nasal coda instead of a rhotic one. Some lects' erhua also causes vowel umlaut. The exception is Hangzhounese, which adds a er²  final instead, which is phonotactically a rhotic.

The syllable  (ciaq) undergoes erhua with the morpheme  (ng), resulting in the syllable cian , which is then represented by the homophonous but etymologically unrelated word  cian . Further examples include:

 Addition of rhotic coda (Examples from Hangzhounese)
  iaq⁷  "duck" →  iaq⁷-er² 
  tsy¹-liau³  "cicada" →  tsy¹-liau³-er² 
  shiau³-kuei³-dei²  "brat" →  shiau³-kuei³-dei²-er² 
 Addition of nasal coda (Examples from Wenzhounese)
  dei⁶-sy¹  "crab" →  dei⁶-sy¹-ng² 
  tseo³  "jujube" →  tseo³-ng² 
 Historical nasal coda resulting in umlaut (Examples from Shanghainese)
  ho¹  "shrimp" →  hoe¹

Yue
Cantonese also exhibits a diminutive formation known as changed tone by altering the base tone contour to that of the dark rising tone, such as the term  (gwong² zau¹ waa⁶⁻², "Cantonese").

References

External links

 .
 .
 Erhua pronunciation MP3 on MIT OpenCourseWare. The accompanying text is located on page 40 of the notes.
 Blog discussion of functions of erhua in meaning, with sound samples.

Mandarin Chinese